Burnside is a locality in the Sunshine Coast Region, Queensland, Australia.

History 
According to local sources, Irish immigrants Patrick King and his wife, Mary, acquired a 314 acres (127 Ha) selection along the southern boundary of the Nambour Cattle Run in 1881. The property was named 'Burnside' derived from the Gaelic term 'burn' (meaning creek), as the selection ran along today's Whalley Creek).

The Whalley family (who the creek was named after) arrived in 1884.

Nambour Special School opened on 24 January 1977.

Burnside State School opened on 23 January 1978. (There was another Burnside State School west of Brisbane which opened in 1877 and was renamed Mulgowie State School.)

Burnside State High School opened on 30 January 1979.

St Joseph's Catholic High School was originally in Nambour but moved to Perwillowen Road in 1979 and was renamed St John's College in honour of St John the Evangelist in 1985.

In 1980, it was decided a TAFE campus should be developed in Burnside, with construction starting in 1981.

Education 

Burnside State School is a government primary (Early Childhood-6) school for boys and girls at 51 Blaxland Road. In 2017, the school had an enrolment of 485 students with 47 teachers (40 full-time equivalent) and 22 non-teaching staff (14 full-time equivalent).

Burnside State High School is a government secondary (7-12) school for boys and girls at Blaxland Road. In 2017, the school had an enrolment of 796 students with 78 teachers (72 full-time equivalent) and 36 non-teaching staff (24 full-time equivalent).

Nambour Special School is a special primary and secondary (Prep-12) school for boys and girls at 70 Windsor Road. In 2017, the school had an enrolment of 151 students with 46 teachers (37 full-time equivalent) and 53 non-teaching staff (34 full-time equivalent). It provides special education in the Sunshine Coast region.

St John's College is a Catholic secondary (7-12) school for boys and girls at Perwillowen Road. In 2017, the school had an enrolment of 765 students with 58 teachers (55 full-time equivalent) and 34 non-teaching staff (26 full-time equivalent).

Physically the TAFE campus is the largest of Sunshine Coast Institute of TAFE campuses, and offers courses including Childcare, Community Work, Conservation and Land Management, Horticulture, Construction, Graphic Design, Music, Photography, Interior Design, and Building Design.

Churches
There are several Christian denominational places of worship in the Burnside area.  They include Nambour Gospel Chapel, Flame Tree Church (Baptist), Nambour Seventh-day Adventist Church, Nambour Presbyterian Church and Nambour Wesleyan Methodist Church.

Services
Sundale Rotary Retirement Community is a seniors community of 80 units and occupying . It has an extensive range of support and entertainment services.

The Australia Post Business Hub for the Nambour area is situated in Burnside.

References

External links 
 

Suburbs of the Sunshine Coast Region
Localities in Queensland